Nebria kocheri is a species of ground beetle in the Nebriinae subfamily that is endemic to Morocco.

References

kocheri
Beetles described in 1953
Beetles of North Africa
Endemic fauna of Morocco